The Rock Pub is a rock-metal pub and music venue at Phaya Thai Road, just below Ratchathewi BTS Station and opposite Asia Hotel in Bangkok, Thailand.

The pub is located near the Siam area in Pathum Wan District, which contains the Siam Paragon, Siam Center and MBK Center shopping malls and the Siam Square shopping area. In the other direction from the pub Pantip Plaza shopping mall is located.

There is live music every night at the Rock Pub.

History
The Rock Pub opened their doors on March 1, 1987, and hundreds of local and international bands have played there since then. They celebrated their 27th anniversary on March 1, 2014.

For almost three decades, many rock bands have performed on the Rock Pub's stage. Over dozens of those became famous in Thailand's music industry. One of the reasons they all had agreed for their success is the experiences they gained from playing there night in and night out.

Artists from all over the world have also played at the Rock Pub: Sodom, Dragonforce, Doro, Exodus, Mr. Gary Bowden, Napalm Death and King Lychee (Hong Kong) are just some of the bands that put on performances at the Rock Pub.

The Rock Pub has seen and gone through different paths. The economy shock in 1997 almost put it out of business, but it stayed strong as the musicians and customers supported and stood by during tough times.

On every March 1 since 1987, rockers from all over Thailand have gathered up and celebrated each year that passed on.

Notable international bands who have played

 The Acacia Strain
 Alesana
 All Shall Perish
 Architects
 A Skylit Drive
 Asking Alexandria
 Atrocity
 Behemoth
 The Black Dahlia Murder
 Caliban
 Carnifex
 The Casualties
 Chiodos
 Chthonic
 Comeback Kid
 Dark Funeral
 Darryl Read
 Decapitated
 Despised Icon
 Destruction
 Didier Wampas
 The Dillinger Escape Plan
 Disgorge
 Doro
 DragonForce
 Dying Fetus
 Emmure
 Enter Shikari
 Every Time I Die
 Exodus
 The Faceless
 The Ghost Inside
 Grave
 The Haunted
 Havok
 Impiety
 Insision
 Iwrestledabearonce
 Leaves' Eyes
 Marduk
 Mayhem
 Napalm Death
 Obscura
 Origin
 Protest The Hero
 Parkway Drive
 Periphery
 Set Your Goals
 Shai Hulud
 Sick of It All
 Silverstein
 Sodom
 Tankard
 Unearth
 Vader
 The Word Alive
 Warbringer

References

External links
 
 The Rock Pub`s official Facebook page
 The Rock Pub on Music Express
 Review on 10Best.com

Ratchathewi district
Tourist attractions in Bangkok
1987 establishments in Thailand
Rock music venues
Music venues completed in 1987
Music venues in Thailand